The 2004–05 OPJHL season is the 12th season of the Ontario Provincial Junior A Hockey League (OPJHL). The thirty-five teams of the North, South, East, and West divisions competed in a 49-game schedule.

Come February, the top eight teams of each division competed for the Frank L. Buckland Trophy, the OJHL championship.  The winner of the Buckland Cup, the St. Michael's Buzzers, competed in the Central Canadian Junior "A" championship, the Dudley Hewitt Cup, and finished 2nd.  The DHC was hosted and won by the Georgetown Raiders who moved to the 2005 Royal Bank Cup but lost in the semi-final.

Changes
Huntsville Wildcats are reformed and changed their name to Huntsville-Muskoka Otters.
Thornhill Rattlers change name to Thornhill Thunderbirds.

Final standings

Note: GP = Games played; W = Wins; L = Losses; OTL = Overtime losses; SL = Shootout losses; GF = Goals for; GA = Goals against; PTS = Points; x = clinched playoff berth; y = clinched division title; z = clinched conference title

Teams listed on the official league website.

Standings listed by Pointstreak on official league website.

2004-05 Frank L. Buckland Trophy Playoffs

Divisional Quarter-final
Port Hope Predators defeated Lindsay Muskies 4-games-to-none
Wellington Dukes defeated Peterborough Stars 4-games-to-none
Trenton Sting defeated Bowmanville Eagles 4-games-to-2
Kingston Voyageurs defeated Cobourg Cougars 4-games-to-none
Aurora Tigers defeated Syracuse Jr. Crunch 4-games-to-1
Newmarket Hurricanes defeated Streetsville Derbys 4-games-to-none
Stouffville Spirit defeated Couchiching Terriers 4-games-to-2
Huntsville-Muskoka Otters defeated Collingwood Blues 4-games-to-1
Georgetown Raiders defeated Mississauga Chargers 4-games-to-none
Oakville Blades defeated Buffalo Jr. Sabres 4-games-to-none
Hamilton Red Wings defeated Brampton Capitals 4-games-to-3
Milton Icehawks defeated Burlington Cougars 4-games-to-1
Wexford Raiders defeated Oshawa Legionaires 4-games-to-none
St. Michael's Buzzers defeated Thornhill Thunderbirds 4-games-to-none
North York Rangers defeated Vaughan Vipers 4-games-to-none
Markham Waxers defeated Pickering Panthers 4-games-to-2
Divisional Semi-final
Port Hope Predators defeated Trenton Sting 4-games-to-none
Wellington Dukes defeated Kingston Voyageurs 4-games-to-1
Aurora Tigers defeated Huntsville-Muskoka Otters 4-games-to-2
Newmarket Hurricanes defeated Stouffville Spirit 4-games-to-2
Georgetown Raiders defeated Milton Icehawks 4-games-to-1
Oakville Blades defeated Hamilton Red Wings 4-games-to-1
Wexford Raiders defeated Markham Waxers 4-games-to-1
St. Michael's Buzzers defeated North York Rangers 4-games-to-1
Divisional Final
Port Hope Predators defeated Wellington Dukes 4-games-to-1
Aurora Tigers defeated Newmarket Hurricanes 4-games-to-2
Georgetown Raiders defeated Oakville Blades 4-games-to-1
St. Michael's Buzzers defeated Wexford Raiders 4-games-to-1
Semi-final
St. Michael's Buzzers defeated Port Hope Predators 4-games-to-2
Georgetown Raiders defeated Aurora Tigers 4-games-to-3
Final
St. Michael's Buzzers defeated Georgetown Raiders 4-games-to-2

Dudley Hewitt Cup Championship
Hosted by Georgetown Raiders in Georgetown, Ontario.  Georgetown won the event, St. Michael's finished second.

Round Robin
Fort William North Stars (SIJHL) defeated St. Michael's Buzzers 6-4 
Georgetown Raiders defeated North Bay Skyhawks (NOJHL) 7-2 
St. Michael's Buzzers defeated North Bay Skyhawks (NOJHL) 4-3 (4OT) 
Georgetown Raiders defeated Fort William North Stars (SIJHL) 4-0 
Georgetown Raiders defeated St. Michael's Buzzers 5-4 
Semi-final
St. Michael's Buzzers defeated Fort William North Stars (SIJHL) 6-2
Final
Georgetown Raiders defeated St. Michael's Buzzers 3-1

2005 Royal Bank Cup Championship
Hosted by Weyburn Red Wings in Weyburn, Saskatchewan.  Georgetown finished in the semi-final.

Round Robin
Weyburn Red Wings (SJHL) defeated Georgetown Raiders 4-3
Georgetown Raiders defeated Hawkesbury Hawks (CJHL) 3-0
Georgetown Raiders defeated Portage Terriers (MJHL) 6-3
Camrose Kodiaks (AJHL) defeated Georgetown Raiders 2-1
Semi-final
Camrose Kodiaks (AJHL) defeated Georgetown Raiders 8-2

Awards and honours

Scoring leaders
Note: GP = Games played; G = Goals; A = Assists; Pts = Points; PIM = Penalty minutes

Rookie of the Year
Peter Leblanc

Players selected in 2005 NHL Entry Draft
Rd 1 #25	Andrew Cogliano -	Edmonton Oilers	(St. Michael's Buzzers)

See also
 2005 Royal Bank Cup
 Dudley Hewitt Cup
 List of OJHL seasons
 Northern Ontario Junior Hockey League
 Superior International Junior Hockey League
 Greater Ontario Junior Hockey League
 2004 in ice hockey
 2005 in ice hockey

References

External links
 Official website of the Ontario Junior Hockey League
 Official website of the Canadian Junior Hockey League

Ontario Junior Hockey League seasons
OPJHL